A matchmaker, or marriage broker, is a person who engages in matchmaking, sometimes as a profession.

Matchmaker or The Matchmaker may also refer to:

Films and television

Feature films
 The Matchmaker (1934 film), an Italian comedy film directed by Amleto Palermi 
 The Matchmaker (1958 film), a 1958 film starring Shirley Booth
 The Matchmaker (1997 film), a 1997 film starring Janeane Garofalo
 The Matchmaker (2010 film), a 2010 Israeli film

Television series
 Matchmaker (game show), a late-80's dating show
 Matchmaker, an English-language Canadian television series
 Svaty, a Ukrainian TV series

Television episodes
 "Matchmaker" (How I Met Your Mother), a 2005 episode of the situation comedy How I Met Your Mother
 "The Matchmaker" (Frasier), a 1994 episode of the situation comedy Frasier

Literature
 Matchmaker, a play by John B. Keane
 The Matchmaker, a 1955 play by Thornton Wilder

Music

Songs 
 “Matchmaker, Matchmaker”, a 1964 song from the musical Fiddler on the Roof

Visual arts
 The Matchmaker (painting), a 1625 painting by Gerard van Honthorst

Other uses
 Matchmakers, an elongated confectionery snack

See also
 Matchmaking, the process of matching two or more people together, usually for the purpose of marriage
 Matchmaker.com, an internet dating service